Cessange is a quarter in south-western Luxembourg City, in southern Luxembourg.

Most of the quarter is covered by open fields to the south-west of Luxembourg City proper.  At the centre of the quarter is the Croix de Cessange: a motorway junction between the A4 and the A6.  Next to the intersection is Stade Boy Konen, which plays host to FC CeBra 01, Rugby Club Luxembourg, and the Luxembourg national rugby union team.

Population
, Cessange has a population of 4,515 inhabitants.

Gallery

References

Quarters of Luxembourg City